Ancylosis rufifasciella is a species of snout moth in the genus Ancylosis. It was described by George Hampson in 1901 and is known from Australia.

References

Moths described in 1901
rufifasciella
Moths of Australia